It's Time! is an album by the American singer Candi Staton. It was released in 1995. The album was nominated for a National Association of Independent Recording Distributors and Manufacturers Award, in the "Gospel/religious" category.

"Mama" was a minor hit, and became a popular song to play on Mother's Day. It was named "Song of the Year" for the 1996 National Parents' Day; Staton performed the song for the Clintons at a Parents' Day event.

Production and promotion
The album was produced by Staton's son, Marcus Williams. "Mama" was written by Staton in 1992. Staton promoted the album by appearing on BET's Our Voices Thanksgiving program.

Critical reception

The Washington Post wrote that Staton "punctuates the Lord's praises with songs that are firmly rooted in everyday concerns and issues ... there's nearly always a fire burning in Staton's voice when she sings, a tone of unwavering passion and commitment." The Dallas Morning News thought that the album "combines the best elements of [Staton's musical past]: gospel heart, Southern enunciation as sweet and measured as molasses and upbeat disco rhythms."

AllMusic noted that "'The Blood' and 'I Want To Grow' express light jazz elements, while 'Rapture Me' is pure funk."

Track listing

References

Candi Staton albums
1995 albums